The following is a list of most watched United States television broadcasts of 2019.

Most watched by week

References

Most watched 2019